Stephanie Drake is an American actress best known for portraying Meredith in the television series Mad Men during its fifth, sixth, and seventh seasons.

Early life
Drake moved around a lot in her youth, but lived for a time in Augusta, Georgia, and grew up mainly in Baltimore. She attended Carver Center for Arts where she studied acting.

After high school, she moved to Los Angeles to attend USC, where she earned a BA in film. She worked at Nordstrom's and J. Crew before finding success as an actor.

Filmography

Film

Television

References

External links
http://www.stephaniemdrake.com/resume.html

Year of birth missing (living people)
Living people
American television actresses
21st-century American actresses